Saint Victorian(us) may refer to:

Victorian, Frumentius and Companions, 5th-century North African martyrs
Victorian of Asan, 6th-century Spanish saint